Lyropupa mirabilis is a species of air-breathing land snail, terrestrial pulmonate gastropod mollusk in the family Pupillidae. This species is endemic to Hawaii.

References

Lyropupa
Molluscs of Hawaii
Gastropods described in 1890
Taxa named by César Marie Félix Ancey
Taxonomy articles created by Polbot